The 2017 Southland Conference men's basketball tournament, was the postseason men's basketball tournament that completed 2016–17 season in the Southland Conference. The tournament was held at the Merrell Center in Katy, Texas from March 8–11, 2017. The winner of the tournament, New Orleans, received the conference's automatic bid to the NCAA tournament with a 68–65 OT win over Texas A&M-Corpus Christi.

Two programs in their final year of the transition from NCAA Division II to Division I, Abilene Christian and Incarnate Word, were ineligible for the tournament.

Seeds
The top 8 teams in the conference qualified for the tournament. The top two seeds earned double byes into the semifinals in the merit-based format. The No. 3 and No. 4 seeds received single byes to the quarterfinals.

Teams were seeded by record within the conference, with a tiebreaker system to seed teams with identical conference records.

Schedule

Bracket

* – denotes overtime period

Game summaries

First round

Quarterfinals

Semifinals

Championship

Awards and honors
Source: 
Tournament MVP:

All-Tournament Team:

See also
2017 Southland Conference women's basketball tournament

References

Southland Conference men's basketball tournament
2016–17 Southland Conference men's basketball season
Southland Conference men's basketball
Sports competitions in Katy, Texas
College basketball tournaments in Texas